Luigi D'Ignazio (born 13 March 1998) is an Italian football player.

Club career
He made his Serie C debut for Cuneo on 15 October 2017 in a game against Livorno.

On 17 January 2019, he joined Sambenedettese on loan until the end of the 2018–19 season.

On 17 July 2019 he joined Cavese on a season-long loan. On 30 January 2020 he moved on loan to Carrarese.

On 18 September 2020 he moved to Turris on a season-long loan.

References

External links
 

1998 births
People from San Giorgio a Cremano
Living people
Italian footballers
Association football defenders
U.S. Gavorrano players
A.C. Cuneo 1905 players
S.S.C. Bari players
A.S. Sambenedettese players
Cavese 1919 players
Carrarese Calcio players
Serie C players
Serie D players
Sportspeople from the Province of Naples
Footballers from Campania